This page details football records and statistics in France.

National team

League

.

Titles
Most top-flight League titles:  10, Saint-Étienne and Paris Saint-Germain
Most consecutive League titles: 7, Lyon

Top-flight appearances
Most appearances: 68 seasons, Marseille
Most consecutive seasons in top-flight: 47 seasons, Paris Saint-Germain (1974–2021)

Wins
Most wins in the top-flight overall: 992, Marseille
Most wins in a top flight season: 30, Paris Saint-Germain (2015–16), Monaco (2016–17)
Most home wins in a top flight season: 19, Saint-Étienne (1974–75)
Most away wins in a top flight season: 13, Monaco (2016–17)
Most consecutive wins: 14, Bordeaux (round 28 2008–09 to round 3 2009–10)
Most consecutive home wins: 28, Saint-Étienne (round 28 1973–74 to round 4 1975–76)
Most consecutive away wins: 9, Marseille (round 24 2008–09 to round 1 2009–10)
Most consecutive wins in a single top flight season: 12, Monaco (round 27 2016–17 to round 38 2016–17)

Draws
Most draws in the top-flight overall: 622, Sochaux

Losses
Most losses in the top-flight overall: 859, Sochaux
Fewest losses in a top flight season: 1, Nantes (1994–95)
Fewest home losses in a top flight season: 0, joint record :
Nantes, 7 seasons
Marseille, Bordeaux, 5 seasons
Saint-Étienne, Monaco, 4 seasons
Sète, Strasbourg, Auxerre, 3 seasons
Nîmes, Bastia, Lens, Paris Saint-Germain, Lyon, 2 seasons
Olympique Lillois, RC Paris, Valenciennes, Angers, Nice, Nancy, Laval, Toulouse, Cannes, 1 season
Fewest away losses in a top flight season: 1, Nantes (1994–95)

Points
Most points in the top-flight overall:
2 points for a win: 2551, Marseille
3 points for a win: 3543, Marseille

Fewest points in a top flight season:
3 points for a win: 17, Lens (1988–89)

Goals
Most goals scored in the top-flight overall: 3611, Marseille
Most goals conceded in the top-flight overall: 3236, FC Sochaux
Highest goal difference in the top-flight overall: +847, Monaco
Most goals scored in a top flight season: 118, Racing CF (1959–60)
Fewest goals conceded in a top flight season: 19, Paris Saint-Germain (2015–16)
Highest goal difference in a top flight season: +83, Paris Saint-Germain (2015–16)

Attendances
Record attendance:  Lille v Lyon played at Stade de France (7 March 2009).

Total titles won (1918–present)

Key

Performance by club
(Sorted by overall titles. Use sorting button to change criteria.)
Last updated: 31 July 2022

The figures in bold represent the most times this competition has been won by a French team.

References

Football records and statistics in France
 
Football in France
French records
France